Wenhua may refer to:

People 
 Wang Wenhua (disambiguation)
 Pan Wenhua (潘文華; 1886–1950), Kuomintang general
 Wei Wenhua (魏文华; 1967–2008), general manager of Shuili Architectural Engineering
 Dong Wenhua (董文华; 1962– ), Chinese PLA singer
 Zhen Wenhua (甄文华; 1967– ), Chinese female shot put athlete

Institutions 
 Wenhua Film Company (文華影業公司), former privately owned Chinese filmmaking company
 Wenhua Qiaoliang Trilingual National School (文化桥梁三语国民学校) in Bali, Indonesia
 National Wen-Hua Senior High School (文華高中), in Taichung, Republic of China (Taiwan)
 The Culture Arts Review, also known as Wen Hwa or Wenhua, Shanghai magazine

Places in the People's Republic of China 
Wenhua Community
 Wenhua, Zhucheng, in Zhucheng Subdistrict, Xinzhou District, Wuhan, Hubei

Wenhua Subdistrict
 Wenhua Subdistrict, Harbin, in Nangang District, Harbin, Heilongjiang
 Wenhua Subdistrict, Qiqihar, in Jianhua District, Qiqihar, Heilongjiang
 Wenhua Subdistrict, Shangqiu, in Suiyang District, Shangqiu, Henan
 Wenhua Subdistrict, Helong, Jilin
 Wenhua Subdistrict, Songyuan, in Ningjiang District, Songyuan, Jilin
 Wenhua Subdistrict, Yantai, in Muping District, Yantai, Shandong

Wenhua Road Subdistrict
 Wenhua Road Subdistrict, Qinhuangdao, in Haigang District, Qinhuangdao, Hebei
 Wenhua Road Subdistrict, Tangshan, in Lubei District, Tangshan, Hebei
 Wenhua Road Subdistrict, Zunhua, Hebei
 Wenhua Road Subdistrict, Zhengzhou, in Jinshui District, Zhengzhou, Henan
 Wenhua Road Subdistrict, Zaozhuang, in Shizhong District, Zaozhuang, Shandong